Sjöqvist is a Swedish surname. Notable people with the surname include:
Erik Sjöqvist (1903–1975), director of Swedish Cyprus Expedition and director of Swedish Institute at Rome
Fritz Sjöqvist (1884–1962), Swedish sailor who competed in the 1912 Summer Olympics
Ingeborg Sjöqvist (1912–2015), Swedish diver who competed in the 1932 Summer Olympics and in the 1936 Summer Olympics
Johan Sjöqvist (1884–1960), Swedish sailor who competed in the 1912 Summer Olympics
Laura Sjöqvist (1903–1964), Swedish diver who competed in the 1928 Summer Olympics

Swedish-language surnames